The Kashmir cave bat (Myotis longipes) is a species of vesper bat. It is endemic to the Western Himalayas of South Asia. 
It is found in the Western Himalayan broadleaf forests ecoregion, within Bhutan, India, Nepal, Pakistan, and Afghanistan.

References

Mouse-eared bats
Bats of Asia
Fauna of the Himalayas
Mammals of India
Mammals of Nepal
Mammals of Pakistan
Mammals of Afghanistan
Western Himalayan broadleaf forests
Mammals described in 1873
Taxonomy articles created by Polbot